Frunze is a rural locality (a selo) in Verkhnetroitsky Selsoviet, Tuymazinsky District, Bashkortostan, Russia. Its population was 241 as of 2010  and it has 3 streets.

Geography 
Frunze is located 35 km south of Tuymazy (the district's administrative centre) by road. Nizhnetroitsky is the nearest rural locality.

References 

Rural localities in Tuymazinsky District